Moataz Zemzemi (born 7 August 1999) is a Tunisian professional footballer who plays as midfielder for Ligue 2 club Niort and the Tunisia national team.

Club career
Zemzemi started his career with Tunisian side Club Africain. In January 2018, he transferred for Ligue 1 side Strasbourg for a fee of €200,000, signing a three and a half year contract, being described by the club as "one for the future". After playing with the B in Championnat National 3 for the second half of the 2017–18 season, he made his first team debut on 19 August 2018, in the Ligue 1 fixture against Saint-Étienne, coming on as a late substitute. 

Zemzemi hit the media spotlight after his involvement in a challenge which left Neymar injured during a Coupe de France match between Strasbourg and Paris Saint-Germain in January 2019.

In January 2020, having failed to break through to the first team, Zemzemi was loaned back to his former club, Club Africain, until the end of the 2019–20 season. He returned to Strasbourg in July 2020, with the season still paused due to the COVID-19 pandemic, having played just three matches. In August 2020, Zemzemi joined Championnat National side Avranches on loan for the 2020–21 season.

On 5 August 2021, Zemzemi signed for Ligue 2 club Niort.

International career
He made his debut for Tunisia national team on 7 June 2019 in a friendly against Iraq, as an 86th-minute substitute for Ali Maâloul.

Career statistics

Club

References

External links

1999 births
Living people
Footballers from Tunis
Tunisian footballers
Association football midfielders
Tunisia international footballers
Tunisian Ligue Professionnelle 1 players
Ligue 1 players
Championnat National players
Championnat National 3 players
Ligue 2 players
Club Africain players
RC Strasbourg Alsace players
US Avranches players
Tunisian expatriate footballers
Chamois Niortais F.C. players
Tunisian expatriate sportspeople in France
Expatriate footballers in France